Canadians in the United Kingdom, or Canadian Britons, are people from Canada living in the United Kingdom and their descendants. In 2001 some 72,518 people born in Canada were living in the UK according to the UK census. Of the ten census tracts with the highest Canadian-born populations, nine were in London, with the other being Cambridge West. The Office for National Statistics estimates that, in 2009, 82,000 Canadian-born people were living in the UK. In 2011 this was the third largest community in the Canadian diaspora after Canadians in the United States and Canadians in Hong Kong.

History 
Britain, and especially London, for a long time served as the metropole to Canadians of British ancestry — as it did to other English-speaking people across the Commonwealth —the centre of their cultural and economic world where the ambitious would go to advance their careers on the biggest stage. This was still true, to some extent, in 1956 when Trinidadian Canadian theatre critic Ronald Bryden arrived in London for the first time looking to find "pure Anglitude" or the true spirit of Englishness, and remarked that the most imperial-looking buildings were the Commonwealth high commissions and those owned by the Canadian banks, the most Anglocentric newspaper was owned by a Canadian, and the best theatre productions starred Canadian actors (in American productions).

Politics 
Hamar Greenwood was a Canadian-born politician who served as a cabinet minister in the Lloyd George ministry.

Bonar Law was a Canadian-born politician who served as Prime Minister of the United Kingdom, and additionally held many other government offices including Secretary of State for the Colonies, Chancellor of the Exchequer and Lord Privy Seal.

Lord Beaverbrook was a Canadian-born businessman and politician who served as a cabinet minister in the Churchill ministry during the Second World War.

Notable people

References 

United Kingdom
 
+
Immigration to the United Kingdom by country of origin